Heslep House is a historic home located at Columbia, South Carolina. It built about 1927, and is a two-story Spanish Mission Revival style stuccoed house.  It features round-headed windows, arches, balconies, sun decks, a square tower, sculptural portal and barrel tile roof.

It was added to the National Register of Historic Places in 1979.

References

Houses on the National Register of Historic Places in South Carolina
Mission Revival architecture in South Carolina
Houses completed in 1927
Houses in Columbia, South Carolina
National Register of Historic Places in Columbia, South Carolina